The 2018 U Sports Men's Final 8 Basketball Tournament was held March 8–11, 2018 in Halifax, Nova Scotia. It was hosted by Acadia University, which also hosted in 1971 on campus in Wolfville, Nova Scotia. The tournament was held at the Scotiabank Centre for the second consecutive year, and was the 31st time the tournament had been played in Halifax.

For the first time in eight years—and just the third time in the past 16—a team other than the Carleton Ravens claimed the national title. The Calgary Dinos edged out the Ryerson Rams to take the championship. It was the first national title for Calgary, and the second consecutive appearance (and loss) in the final game for Ryerson. Carleton took the bronze medal over the McGill Redmen. While the Ravens took some consolation in that, Carleton basketball was buoyed later the same day (March 11), when its women's team claimed its first-ever national crown, in Regina.

Tournament seeds

Results

Bracket
Championship Bracket

Consolation Bracket

Quarter-finals

Consolation Semi-Finals

Semi-finals

Fifth place

Third place

Final

See also 
2018 U Sports Women's Basketball Championship
2018 NCAA Division I men's basketball tournament

References 

U Sports Men's Basketball Championship
U Sports Men's Basketball Championship
Sports competitions in Halifax, Nova Scotia
U Sports Men's Basketball Championship